
Year 328 (CCCXXVIII) was a leap year starting on Monday (link will display the full calendar) of the Julian calendar. At the time, it was known as the Year of the Consulship of Ianuarinus and Iustus (or, less frequently, year 1081 Ab urbe condita). The denomination 328 for this year has been used since the early medieval period, when the Anno Domini calendar era became the prevalent method in Europe for naming years.

Events 
 By place 
 Roman Empire 
 July 5 – Constantine's Bridge, built over the Danube between Sucidava (Corabia, Romania) and Oescus (Gigen, Bulgaria), is officially opened by the Roman architect Theophilus Patricius.
 December 7 – Lakhmid king Imru' al-Qays ibn 'Amr dies. His epitaph, the Namara inscription, is an important source for the Arabic Language.

 By topic 
 Religion 
 May 9 – Alexandria's patriarch bishop Alexander dies and is succeeded by his deacon Athanasius.

Births 
 Flavius Julius Valens, Roman emperor (d. 378)
 Huan Chong, Chinese general and governor (d. 384)
 Yuan Hong, Chinese historian and politician (d. 376)

Deaths 
 Alexander I, pope and patriarch of Alexandria
 Papa (or Papa bar Aggai), Sassanid bishop
 Su Jun, Chinese general and politician
 Yu Wenjun, Chinese empress (b. 297)

References